Kömpöc is a  village in Bács-Kiskun county, in the Southern Great Plain region of southern Hungary.

Croats in Hungary call this village Kempac and Kompac.

Geography

References

External links 
 Kömpöc a Kiskunmajsa és Térsége Területfejl. Önkorm. Társulás honlapján

Populated places in Bács-Kiskun County